Much of the British independent film, television and post-production industry is based in London's Soho area. Many of the people who work in the industry form a village-like community, with the various companies hiring and re-hiring one another's employees, and, like many other villages, having a lively social life that revolves around gossip and the eighty or so pubs in Soho.

Post-production companies in Soho include:
 Ascent Media
 Double Negative
 Film Cut Post Production
 Framestore CFC
 Goldcrest Post-Production
 Moving Picture Company
 Evolutions Television
 Reliance MediaWorks Ltd
 Rushes
 TVC Soho
 The Yard

Locations
The above listed "Cinesite" company is near London's Piccadilly Circus, though there is also a non-graphical department based at Pinewood Studios, who made some of mechanical props for the Harry Potter films, amongst other productions.

"The Mill" is at the western end of Dean Street and is in a white 3-storey building with a purple door. Whereas a rival Co "Framestore-CFC" is just a minutes walk away along the same road, being midway along, on a corner, with a large windowed frontage along its ground-floor.

Also, though not media related, but CGI related, is Sony's PlayStation game creation department of Europe, which is also located in London's Soho, specifically off Golden Square, the latter having a sleeping-giant sculpture that is opposite the front door of SCE. This video-game studio is housed in a large stone-built  building with a brass plaque out front.

See also

 Groucho Club

Cinema of the United Kingdom
Soho, London